Miss Fortune is the third album by singer/songwriter Allison Moorer. It was her first for new label Universal South, which was co-founded by Tony Brown, who signed her to her first label MCA Nashville. Her first album there saw her working for the first time with Nashville producer R.S. Field and moving towards a more pop sound.

Track listing

Personnel

 Jay Bennett – electric guitar, Leslie guitar, mandolin, Hammond organ
 Kenneth Blevins – drums
 Mike Brignardello – bass guitar
 Chris Carmichael – fiddle, violin, strings, string arrangements, conductor
 Steve Conn – accordion, clarinet, piano
 R.S. Field – electric guitar
 David Grissom – electric guitar
 Yvonne Hodges – background vocals
 Jim Hoke – baritone saxophone, tenor saxophone, horn arrangements
 Bill Huber – euphonium, trombone, bass trombone
 Manfred Jerome – percussion
 Rob McNelley – acoustic guitar, electric guitar
 Allison Moorer – lead vocals, background vocals
 Kim Morrison – background vocals
 Greg Morow – drums, percussion
 The Nashville String Machine – strings
 Michael Noble – banjo, dobro, acoustic guitar
 Russ Pahl – pedal steel guitar, slide guitar
 Alison Prestwood – bass guitar
 Jared Reynolds – background vocals
 Neal Rosengarden – euphonium, french horn, trumpet
 Rick Schell – drums, percussion, background vocals
 Michael Webb – Fender Rhodes, keyboards, Hammond organ, piano, Wurlitzer

Chart performance

References

2002 albums
Show Dog-Universal Music albums
Allison Moorer albums